Atelornis is a small genus of birds in the ground-roller family Brachypteraciidae. The genus is endemic to Madagascar.

Species 
There are two species:

 
Bird genera
 
Taxonomy articles created by Polbot
Taxa named by Jacques Pucheran